The 2005 Proximus 24 Hours of Spa was the 58th running of the Spa 24 Hours and the sixth race for the 2005 FIA GT Championship season.  It featured the combination of the FIA GT's two classes (GT1 and GT2) with cars from national and one-make series, designated G2 and G3.  It took place on 30  and 31 July 2005 at Circuit de Spa-Francorchamps, Belgium.

Half-point leaders
For the FIA GT Championship, the top eight cars in the GT1 and GT2 classes are awarded half points for their positions after six hours and twelve hours into the race.  Points to the top eight were awarded in the order of 4.0 – 3.0 – 2.5 – 2.0 – 1.5 – 1.0 – 0.5.

Note that the factory Aston Martin Racing squads and the GLPK-Carsport team are listed in these results for the place in which they were running at the time.  They were however unable to score points and thus are skipped.

6 Hour leaders in GT1

6 Hour leaders in GT2

12 Hour leaders in GT1

12 Hour leaders in GT2

Official results
Class winners in bold.  Cars failing to complete 70% of winner's distance marked as Not Classified (NC).

† – These entries are factory teams and thus do not score points for the championship.

Statistics
 Pole Position – #9 Vitaphone Racing Team – 2:14.845
 Fastest Lap – #10 Vitaphone Racing Team – 2:15.598
 Average Speed – 166.63 km/h

References

External links
 Official Results
 Race results

S
Spa
Spa 24 Hours